Tony John Pamphlett (born 13 April 1960) is an English former professional footballer, who played in The Football League for Maidstone United.

After retiring from football he worked as a carpenter for over twenty years and later became a London taxi driver. As of 2012 he resided in Welling, Greater London.

Honours
Maidstone United
Football Conference: 1988–89

References

Notes

English footballers
Cray Wanderers F.C. players
Dartford F.C. players
Maidstone United F.C. (1897) players
Redbridge Forest F.C. players
Dagenham & Redbridge F.C. players
English Football League players
National League (English football) players
1960 births
Living people
Association football defenders